Colegio Juan XXIII (originally called "Scuola Giovanni XXIII") is an Italian private & religious school in Maracay (Venezuela).

History

The Colegio Italo venezolano "Juan XXIII" was created in the early 1960s to meet the educational and catholic needs of the Italian community in Maracay.  The initial courses of the Scuola Giovanni ventitre (as was called) were in Italian language with some Spanish lessons, but after a few years all the courses were bilingual in Spanish and Italian.

In the late 1990s were added the first years of "Bachillerato" (High school), that was done mainly in Spanish but with some Italian lessons. Actually the "Colegio Juan XXIII" (as is usually called) has nearly 700 students and all the courses are only in Spanish language. Italian is done as a foreign language mandatory in high school ("Bachillerato venezolano").

Students of this prestigious Maracay "Colegio" often participate in meetings and celebrations promoted by the Italian embassy and the Dante Alighieri association

Notes

Bibliography
 Cassani Pironti, Fabio. Gli italiani in Venezuela dall’Indipendenza al Secondo Dopoguerra. Roma, 2004

See also
 Colegio Agustín Codazzi
 Colegio Amerigo Vespucci
 Colegio De Marta
 Colegio Antonio Rosmini
 Colegio NS de Pompei
 Italo-Venezuelans
 Italian language in Venezuela

Italian international schools in South America
International schools in Venezuela
1963 establishments in Venezuela
Educational institutions established in 1963